Marie Ponsot  (née Birmingham; April 6, 1921 – July 5, 2019) was an American poet, literary critic, essayist, teacher, and translator. Her awards and honors included the National Book Critics Circle Award, Delmore Schwartz Memorial Prize, the Robert Frost Poetry Award, the Shaughnessy Medal of the Modern Language Association, the Ruth Lilly Poetry Prize from the Poetry Foundation, and the Aiken Taylor Award for Modern American Poetry.

Life
Ponsot was born in Brooklyn, New York, the daughter of Marie Candee, a public school teacher, and William Birmingham, an importer. She grew up in Jamaica, Queens along with her brother. She was already writing poems as a child, some of which were published in the Brooklyn Daily Eagle. After graduating from St. Joseph's College for Women in Brooklyn, Ponsot earned her master's degree in seventeenth-century literature from Columbia University. After the Second World War, she journeyed to Paris, where she met and married Claude Ponsot, a painter and student of Fernand Léger. The couple lived in Paris for three years, during which time they had a daughter. Her friend the American poet Lawrence Ferlinghetti published her first book of poetry, True Minds,  in 1956. Later, Ponsot and her husband relocated to the United States. The couple went on to have six sons before divorcing. She was left with seven children and she was not publishing her poetry. (Years later Claude Ponsot, by then a professor, became chairman at the fine arts department of St. John's University in Queens, New York.)

Upon returning from France, Ponsot worked as a freelance writer of radio and television scripts. She also translated 69 children's books from the French, including The Fables of La Fontaine.

She co-authored with Rosemary Deen two books about the fundamentals of writing, Beat Not the Poor Desk and Common Sense.

Ponsot taught a poetry thesis class, as well as writing classes, at the Poetry Center of the 92nd Street Y. She also taught at the YMCA, Beijing United University, New York University, and Columbia University, and she served as an English professor at Queens College in New York, from which she retired in 1991.

She was the Chancellor of the Academy of American Poets from 2010 to 2014.

Ponsot lived in New York City until her death at NewYork–Presbyterian Hospital on July 5, 2019.

Ponsot was a mentor to many younger poets and writers. Sapphire wrote an essay in her honor for an event celebrating the 2009 publication of Ponsot's collection entitled Easy. Poet Marilyn Hacker has described her as being "one of the major poets of her generation." Ponsot was also a lifelong friend and mentor to Hacker and science fiction writer Samuel R. Delany.

Awards
Ponsot authored several collections of poetry, including The Bird Catcher (1998), a finalist for the 1999 Lenore Marshall Poetry Prize and the winner of the National Book Critics Circle Award, and Springing: New and Selected Poems (2002), which was named a "notable book of the year" by The New York Times Book Review.

Among her awards were a creative writing grant from the National Endowment for the Arts, the Delmore Schwartz Memorial Prize, The Robert Frost Poetry Award, the Shaughnessy Medal of the Modern Language Association, the 2013 Ruth Lilly Poetry Prize from the Poetry Foundation, and the 2015 Aiken Taylor Award for Modern American Poetry.

Selected bibliography
 True Minds, City Lights Pocket Bookshop, (1956)
 Admit Impediment, Knopf, (1981)
 The Green Dark, Knopf, (1988) 
 The Bird Catcher, Knopf, (1998) 
 Springing: New and Selected Poems, A.A. Knopf, (2002) 
 
 Collected Poems, Knopf (2016) .

Translations

Non-fiction

References

External links
  Marie Ponsot profile and poems at Academy of American Poets
  Poetry Foundation
  Random House interview and photograph
  Bomb Magazine interview by Benjamin Ivry with Marie Ponsot
 "The Wonder Years" Review of Marie Ponsot's book Easy by Stephen Burt. New York Times. December 16, 2009.
  Video clip. November 2, 2009. 
  Video clip. Breakout: Voices from Inside. A 2009 PEN American Center event.
Stuart A. Rose Manuscript, Archives, and Rare Book Library, Emory University: Marie Ponsot papers, 1931-2014

1921 births
2019 deaths
American literary critics
Women literary critics
American women poets
20th-century American translators
20th-century American poets
20th-century American women writers
21st-century American translators
21st-century American poets
21st-century American women writers
Writers from Brooklyn
People from Jamaica, Queens
St. Joseph's College (New York) alumni
Columbia University alumni
New York University faculty
Columbia University faculty
Queens College, City University of New York faculty
American expatriates in France
American women non-fiction writers
20th-century American non-fiction writers
21st-century American non-fiction writers
American women academics
American women critics